Dermot Patrick Honan (died 20 July 1986) was a  Fianna Fáil politician from County Clare in Ireland who served as a senator for 8 years.

A licensed vintner before entering politics, he was elected in 1965 to the 11th Seanad Éireann on the Industrial and Commercial Panel, and was re-elected in 1969 to the 12th Seanad. He was defeated in the 1973 Seanad election, but his wife Tras Honan was elected as a senator in 1977, and in a 15-year career in Seanad Éireann she was twice elected as Cathaoirleach (speaker). His father T. V. Honan had been a senator from 1934 to 1954.

See also 
Families in the Oireachtas

References 

Year of birth missing
1986 deaths
Fianna Fáil senators
Members of the 11th Seanad
Members of the 12th Seanad
Politicians from County Laois
Spouses of Irish politicians